The 2021–22 LSU Tigers women's  basketball team represents Louisiana State University during the 2021–22 NCAA Division I women's basketball season. The Lady Tigers, led by first-year head coach Kim Mulkey, play their home games at the Pete Maravich Assembly Center and compete as members of the Southeastern Conference (SEC).

Previous season
The Tigers finished the season 9–13 (6–8 SEC) to finish in eighth in the conference. Head coach Nikki Fargas resigned at the end of the season to become president of the Las Vegas Aces. Baylor head coach Kim Mulkey was hired to replace her.

Offseason

Departures

2021 recruiting class

Incoming transfers

Roster

Schedule

|-
!colspan=9 style=| Non-conference pre-season

|-
!colspan=9 style=| Non-conference regular season

|-
!colspan=9 style=| SEC regular season

|-
!colspan=9 style=| SEC Tournament

|-
!colspan=9 style=| NCAA tournament

See also
2021–22 LSU Tigers men's basketball team

References

LSU Lady Tigers basketball seasons
LSU
LSU
LSU Lady Tigers
LSU Lady Tigers